David Atwood (December 15, 1815 – December 11, 1889) was a nineteenth-century American politician, publisher, editor and printer from Wisconsin.  He represented Wisconsin's 2nd Congressional District in the United States House of Representatives during the 2nd and 3rd sessions of the 41st Congress.

Biography

Born in Bedford, New Hampshire, Atwood attended the public schools as a child. He moved to Hamilton, New York in 1832 where he was apprenticed as a printer and later became publisher of the Hamilton Palladium. He moved to Freeport, Illinois in 1845 and engaged in agricultural pursuits before moving to Madison, Wisconsin in 1847 and for forty-two years was editor and publisher of the Wisconsin Journal. Atwood was commissioned a major general in the Wisconsin Militia by Governor Alexander W. Randall in 1858, was a member of the Wisconsin State Assembly in 1861, was a United States assessor for four years and served as mayor of Madison, Wisconsin in 1868 and 1869.

In 1870, he was elected a Republican to the United States House of Representatives to fill a vacancy caused by the death of Benjamin F. Hopkins. He took over representing Wisconsin's 2nd congressional district in the 41st Congress serving until 1871 and declined to be a candidate for renomination in 1870 to the 42nd Congress.

Afterwards, Atwood resumed activities in the newspaper business, was a commissioner at the Centennial Exposition representing the State of Wisconsin from 1872 to 1876 and was a delegate to the Republican National Convention in 1872 and 1876.

He died in Madison, Wisconsin on December 11, 1889, and was interred in Forest Hill Cemetery in Madison.

External links

1815 births
1889 deaths
People from Bedford, New Hampshire
Republican Party members of the United States House of Representatives from Wisconsin
Republican Party members of the Wisconsin State Assembly
Mayors of Madison, Wisconsin
19th-century American newspaper publishers (people)
American printers
Editors of Wisconsin newspapers
People from Hamilton, New York
People from Freeport, Illinois
19th-century American journalists
American male journalists
19th-century American male writers
19th-century American politicians
Journalists from Illinois